Andreas Heraf (born 10 September 1967) is an Austrian football manager and former player, most recently in charge of Türkgücü München. He was previously the technical director for New Zealand Football and head coach for the New Zealand women's national team.

Club career
A defensive midfielder, Heraf started his professional playing career at Rapid Wien and moved to city rivals First Vienna in 1988. He then had half a season at Austria Salzburg, before joining Vorwärts Steyr. After another half season at German Second division side Hannover 96, he returned to Rapid Wien. In his first season back, the longhaired Heraf played in the 1995–96 UEFA Cup Winners Cup Final against Paris St Germain in Brussels, which Rapid lost. He finished his career at FC Kärnten.

International career
Heraf made his debut for the Austria national team in an April 1996 friendly match against Hungary and was a participant at the 1998 FIFA World Cup but he did not play. He earned 11 caps. His first and only goal he scored versus Latvia 1997. Herafs last international was an October 1998 World Cup qualification match against San Marino.

Managerial career
After retiring, he became a manager. His clubs were Austria Lustenau, SC Schwanenstadt, FC Superfund and SC Schwanenstadt again. After a few months at SC-ESV Parndorf 1919, he joined the Austrian U-20 set-up.

New Zealand women's national team
On 24 April 2017, Heraf was announced as the New Zealand Football technical director. Later that same year, he also become the coach for the New Zealand women's national team.

After the Football Ferns lost to Japan in June 2018, there was calls for Heraf to resign following his comments in the post match press conference, including that the team would never have the quality to compete with other teams and the size of New Zealand meant they could not compete. He later stated he was misunderstood and that he would not resign. On 19 June, a letter of complaint signed by at least ten players was sent to New Zealand Football, collated by the New Zealand Professional Footballers' Association. Later that day, it was also announced that New Zealand Football were deliberately flouting a FIFA directive that Heraf should not be in charge of both roles at the same organisation.

On 20 June, it emerged that the Players' Union had sent a strongly worded letter to New Zealand Football, instructing them to discontinue all communications with players, after Heraf and other New Zealand Football staff members were contacting players and strongly encouraging them not to write letters or issue any formal complaints. That afternoon, it was announced that Heraf would be placed on special leave while an independent investigation was conducted into the allegations around bullying, intimidation and a culture of fear.

On 31 July, it was announced that Heraf and New Zealand Football parted ways and that he would leave by the end of the week, after thirteen players refused to play and complained about him.

Return to Europe
After several years at Floridsdorfer AC and SV Ried, he joined Türkgücü München in December 2021.

Honours
Rapid Wien
 Austrian Bundesliga: 1986–87, 1987–88, 1995–96
 Austrian Cup: 1986–87, 1987–88, 2000–01

FC Kärnten
 Austrian Cup: 2000–01

Notes

References

External links
Player profile and stats – Rapid Archive 
2. Bundesliga stats – Fussballportal 

1967 births
Living people
Footballers from Vienna
Austrian footballers
Austria international footballers
1998 FIFA World Cup players
SK Rapid Wien players
First Vienna FC players
FC Red Bull Salzburg players
SK Vorwärts Steyr players
Hannover 96 players
FC Kärnten players
Austrian Football Bundesliga players
2. Bundesliga players
Expatriate footballers in Germany
Austrian football managers
Association football midfielders
SC Austria Lustenau managers
New Zealand women's national football team managers
Floridsdorfer AC managers
1. FC Saarbrücken managers
SV Ried managers
Expatriate football managers in Germany
Expatriate association football managers in New Zealand
2. Bundesliga managers
Austrian expatriate football managers
Austrian expatriate sportspeople in Germany
Austrian expatriate sportspeople in New Zealand
Austrian Football Bundesliga managers